Taltheilei Narrows Water Aerodrome  is located in McLeod Bay on Great Slave Lake in the Northwest Territories, Canada. It is open from June to September.

See also
 Taltheilei Narrows Airport

References

Registered aerodromes in the North Slave Region
Seaplane bases in the Northwest Territories